The 2012–13 Svenska Cupen was the 57th season of Svenska Cupen and the first season since 2000–01 to be held according to the fall-spring season format. The season also reintroduced a group stage, the first since 1995–96.

A total of 96 clubs entered the competition. The first round commenced on 3 June 2012 and the final was contested on 26 May 2013 at Friends Arena in Solna. Helsingborgs IF were the defending champions, having beaten Kalmar FF 3–1 in last season's final.

IFK Göteborg won their sixth Svenska Cupen title on 26 May 2013 after defeating Djurgårdens IF 3–1 on penalties after the match had finished 1–1 after extra time.

The only one of the Swedish District Football Associations that had a qualifying round was Dalarnas FF, the other ones decided their teams in other ways. The first round commenced on 3 March 2012 and the final was contested on 22 May 2012.

Dalarnas FF qualification

References

External links
 Official site 
 2012–13 Svenska Cupen at Soccerway

2012-13 Q
Svenska Cupen Q
Cupen Q
Cupen Q